Kraig is a male given name as well as a family name. Notable people with the name include:

As a given name:
Kraig Chiles, American soccer player
Kraig Grady, musician
Kraig Kann, anchor on The Golf Channel
Kraig Kinser, American race car driver
Kraig Metzinger, American actor
Kraig Nienhuis, hockey player
Kraig Paulsen, politician from Iowa
Kraig Urbik, American football player
Kraig Pruett, Film Director

As a surname:

Donald Michael Kraig, American occult author

See also 

Kraig Biocraft Laboratories, a biotechnology company
Craig (disambiguation)